Yevhen Valeriyovych Volynets (born 26 August 1993) is a Ukrainian professional footballer who plays as a goalkeeper for Kolos Kovalivka in the Ukrainian Premier League.

Career
Volynets was born in Kaniv, but in age of 5 he moved with his family to the capital. He began to play football in Kyiv, where he joined the Dynamo Kyiv youth sportive school system.

Despite being a part of Dynamo's sportive system, Volynets never make his debut for the main team and in summer 2016 transferred to the Ukrainian First League side Helios Kharkiv.

References

External links
 
 

1993 births
Living people
People from Cherkasy Oblast
Ukraine youth international footballers
Ukrainian footballers
Association football goalkeepers
FC Dynamo-2 Kyiv players
FC Helios Kharkiv players
FC Kolos Kovalivka players
Ukrainian Premier League players
Ukrainian First League players
Sportspeople from Cherkasy Oblast